Winston Hill  (born 17 September 1993) is a Fijian boxer. He competed in the men's welterweight event at the 2016 Summer Olympics, where he lost to Vladimir Margaryan in the first round.

Hill is of Rotuman descent. He won a silver medal at the 2015 Pacific Games in the Men's Welterweight division.

References

External links

1993 births
Living people
Fijian male boxers
Olympic boxers of Fiji
Boxers at the 2016 Summer Olympics
Place of birth missing (living people)
Fijian people of Rotuman descent
Commonwealth Games medallists in boxing
Commonwealth Games bronze medallists for Fiji
Boxers at the 2018 Commonwealth Games
Welterweight boxers
Medallists at the 2018 Commonwealth Games